Kala Keerthi Vimukthi Jayasundara is a Sri Lankan filmmaker, critic and a visual artist. Jayasundara is the first Sri Lankan to win the Caméra d'Or, in 2005.

Life and career
Vimukthi Jayasundara was born in Ratnapura, Sri Lanka but comes from Galle. He attended Mahinda College, and the Film and Television Institute of India in Pune.

Filmography

Acting roles

Awards
In 2005, Jayasundara received  Caméra d'Or award at the Cannes Film Festival for the Best Debut Director for his film Sulanga Enu Pinisa.

Accolades
 2021 – Jury member at 52nd International Film Festival of India, Goa.

See also
 Cinéfondation

References

External links

 
 
 
 Vimukthi Jayasundara at Sinhala Cinema Database

Living people
Sri Lankan film directors
Alumni of Mahinda College
Film and Television Institute of India alumni
1977 births
Kala Keerthi
Directors of Caméra d'Or winners